Sir William Dennis Pile  (1 December 1919 – 26 January 1997) was an English civil servant. Educated at St Catharine's College, Cambridge, he served in the Army during the Second World War, reaching the rank of Major. After completing his degree, he entered the Ministry of Education in 1947, serving on the UK delegation to UNESCO and then spending a year at the Cabinet Office (1950–51) before returning to the Ministry, which became the Department for Education and Science (DES) in 1964. From 1966 to 1970, he spent short periods at the Ministry of Health and the Home Office, the later as deputy secretary from 1967. From 1970 to 1976, he was Permanent Secretary to the DES. He was then chairman of the Board of Inland Revenue between 1976 and 1979. In retirement, he was a director of Nationwide Building Society and The Distillers Company.

References 

1919 births
1997 deaths
English civil servants
Alumni of St Catharine's College, Cambridge
Knights Grand Cross of the Order of the Bath
Members of the Order of the British Empire
Permanent Under-Secretaries of State for Education and Skills
Chairmen of the Board of Inland Revenue
Civil servants in the Home Office
Civil servants in the Ministry of Health (United Kingdom)
Civil servants in the Cabinet Office